Trischidias is a genus of typical bark beetles in the family Curculionidae. There are about 11 described species in Trischidias.

Species
These 11 species belong to the genus Trischidias:
 Trischidias atoma Wood & Bright, 1992
 Trischidias atomus Alonso-Zarazaga, M.A., Lyal & C.H.C., 2009
 Trischidias exigua Wood, 1986
 Trischidias georgiae Hopkins, 1915
 Trischidias minutissima Wood, 1954
 Trischidias nigrina Wood & Bright, 1992
 Trischidias puertoricensis Bright & Torres, 2006
 Trischidias spinata Wood & Bright, 1992
 Trischidias spinatus (Schedl, 1977d)
 Trischidias striata Atkinson, 1993a
 Trischidias striatus Atkinson, 1993a

References

Further reading

 
 
 

Scolytinae
Articles created by Qbugbot